The Stapleton station is an elevated Staten Island Railway station in the neighborhood of Stapleton, Staten Island, New York, located at Bay Street and Prospect Street on the main line.

History 
This station opened on July 31, 1884, with the extension of the SIRT from Vanderbilt's Landing to Tompkinsville. Stapleton was rehabilitated in 1936 as part of a grade crossing elimination project.

Station layout

The station has an island platform and two tracks. South of the station, tracks diverge from the line on the Saint George-bound side to the Clifton Yard. This is where the railway cars are moved from the Staten Island Railway by truck to get work done at the Coney Island Shops.

Exits
The north end has an exit to Prospect Street and a New York City Department of Transportation Park and Ride facility to the west side of the right-of-way (next to Bay Street). The south end exits to Water Street and Bay Street.

References

External links 

Staten Island Railway station list
Staten Island Railway general information
Platform from Google Maps Street View

Staten Island Railway stations
Railway stations in the United States opened in 1884
1884 establishments in New York (state)
Stapleton Heights, Staten Island